Bordumsa is a town located in the Changlang district of Arunachal Pradesh, India.  As of 2008, the population of Bordumsa is 29,368.

References 

Changlang
Cities and towns in Changlang district